Events from the year 1979 in art.

Events
 October 25 – Frederic Edwin Church's 1861 painting The Icebergs sells for US$2.5 million at Sotheby's New York, the third-highest amount paid for any painting at auction at this date.
 November 15 – Art historian and former Surveyor of the Queen's Pictures Anthony Blunt's role as one of the 'Cambridge Five' double agents for the Soviet NKVD during World War II is revealed by Prime Minister Margaret Thatcher in the House of Commons of the United Kingdom.
 The Xing xing ("The Stars Group") of 20 avant-garde Chinese artists (including Ma Desheng, Wang Keping, Huang Rui, Li Shuang, Qu Leilei, Ah Cheng and Ai Weiwei) stage an illegal exhibition outside the National Art Museum of China in Beijing.
 The Bauhaus Archive, designed by Alexander Cvijanović with Hans Bandel after Walter Gropius, is completed in West Berlin, Germany.
 Edward Delaney's statue of Wolfe Tone in Dublin is destroyed by terrorists.

Awards
 Archibald Prize: Wes Walters – Portrait of Phillip Adams

Works

 Michael Andrews – Melanie and Me Swimming
 Judy Chicago – The Dinner Party (collaborative installation, completed)
 Paul Delvaux – The Road to Rome (painting)
 Jenny Holzer – Truisms
 Lee Kelly – sculptures (Portland, Oregon)
 Elkhorn
 Nash
 Jack Mackie and Charles Greening – Dancer's Series: Steps (bronze, Seattle)
 Joan Mitchell 
 La Vie en Rose
Salut Tom
 Andrzej Pitynski – The Partisans (aluminum sculpture)
 Enzo Plazzotta – Attitude II (Margot Fonteyn)
 John Rogers – 118 Modules (sculpture, Portland, Oregon)
 Michael Snow – Flight Stop (sculpture, Toronto Eaton Centre)
 Don Wilson – Holon (sculpture, Portland, Oregon)

Exhibitions
April 22 to June 10 – Special Projects (Scott Belville. John Boone. Andrea Callard. Katherine Carter. Ian Crofts, Lauren Ewing, Heide Fasnicht, Betty Goodwin, Norman Hasselriis, Alan Herman, Jeff (Jeff Russell), and Elaine Reichek) at PS1 in Queens, New York.

Births
 July 25 – Ahmed Mater, Saudi artist
 date unknown
 Aideen Barry, Irish multimedia and performance artist
 Éric Bourdon, French painter and writer
 Elise Fouin, French designer

Deaths
 January 11 – Daniel-Henry Kahnweiler, German-born French Art dealer (born 1884)
 February 3 – Aaron Douglas, American painter (born 1898)
 February 7 – Charles Tunnicliffe, British wildlife painter (born 1901)
 March 20 – Jean Charlot, French painter and illustrator (born 1898)
 April 5 – Eugène Gabritschevsky, Russian biologist and artist (born 1893)
 June 23 – Reynolds Stone, English wood engraver (born 1909)
 June 25
 Dave Fleischer, Austrian American animator, film director, and film producer (born 1894)
 Philippe Halsman, Latvian American portrait photographer (born 1906)
 July 13 – Ludwig Merwart, Austrian painter and graphic artist (born 1913)
 August 20 – Christian Dotremont, Belgian painter and poet (born 1922)
 August 29 – Ivon Hitchens, English painter (born 1893)
 September 17 – Paul Maze, French-born English Post-Impressionist painter (born 1887)
 November 8 – Edward Ardizzone, British writer and illustrator (born 1900)
 November 20 – Tyra Lundgren, Swedish painter, ceramist, glass and textile designer and writer on art (born 1897)
 December 5 – Sonia Delaunay, Ukrainian-French artist (born 1885)
 December 23 – Peggy Guggenheim, American-born art collector (born 1898)
 December 26 – Karl Hubbuch, German painter, printmaker and draughtsman (born 1891)
 date unknown
 Russell Brockbank, Canadian-born cartoonist (born 1913)
 Sheila Fell, English painter (born 1931)

Awards

See also
 1979 in fine arts of the Soviet Union

References

 
Years of the 20th century in art
1970s in art